is a Japanese composer, conductor, and writer born in Tokyo on January 27, 1965. Ito has been assistant professor at University of Tokyo since 2000.

References 

1965 births
Japanese classical composers
Japanese conductors (music)
Japanese male classical composers
Living people
21st-century conductors (music)
21st-century Japanese male musicians
Academic staff of the University of Tokyo